Turn Off the Lights is a browser extension developed by Stefan Van Damme that lets users dim everything on their screen except the video they are watching.

Operation
A gray lamp icon is displayed in the browser menu bar when a video is detected; users click on the icon to make the screen surrounding the video fade. Clicking outside the video restores the rest of the screen. Users can adjust the opacity of the screen blocking and select a color other than black if desired. The extension can also be set to dim the screen automatically, and there are a variety of YouTube-specific features as well to bring an object to the front. A keyboard shortcut gives users quick access to the program's services.

Reception
In 2017, Turn Off the Lights was awarded the "Bronze Award" and the "People's Lovie Awards" from Lovie Awards. Turn Off the Lights was named the winner for Best Websites, Web Services and Applications in the 7th annual Lovie Awards.

See also

List of Firefox extensions
Google Chrome extension

References

External links
 Turn Off the Lights Turn Off the Lights Homepage

2009 software
Internet Explorer add-ons
Free Firefox WebExtensions
Google Chrome extensions
Microsoft Edge extensions
Software using the GPL license